Deir Razih is a Palestinian village in the southern West Bank located  southwest of Hebron, in the Hebron Governorate. It relies mainly on nearby Dura for basic services. Its total land area is made of 540 dunams, including its built-up area.

History
Ceramics from the Byzantine era have been found here.

Ottoman era
French explorer Victor Guérin visited  the place in 1863, during the late Ottoman era. He described it as a ruin, with one structure larger than the rest above an underground magazine.

In 1883, the PEF's  Survey of Western Palestine found  "walls, cisterns and caves. Rock-cut tombs to the east" of the village.

British Mandate era
At the time of the 1931 census of Palestine,  conducted by the British Mandate authorities,  the population of  Kh. Dair Razih  was counted under Dura.

Jordanian era
In the wake of the 1948 Arab–Israeli War, and after the 1949 Armistice Agreements, Kh. Dair Razih came under Jordanian rule.

The Jordanian census of 1961 found 130 inhabitants in Deir Razih.

Post 1967
After the Six-Day War in 1967,  Deir Razih has been under  Israeli occupation.

In the summer of 2007, a group of Israeli settlers from Otniel accompanied by soldiers and a bulldozers entered village lands and uprooted 150 olive, almond and pine trees. Having done this they, also, set fire to the land causing damage to crops and pastures. Fire brigades from the Palestinian municipalities of Dura and as-Samu' extinguish the fires soon after.

In the 1997 census by the Palestinian Central Bureau of Statistics (PCBS), the village had a total population of 236, of which 11.9% were Palestinian refugees. By mid-year 2006, there were 328 inhabitants. However, the PCBS census of 2007 revealed that the population was 268.  Deir Razih is inhabited by the extended families of Amru, Abu Arqub, Hija, and the al-Azazmeh Bedouins. Most residents depend on agriculture as main income.

References

Bibliography

External links
Welcome To Kh. Dayr Razih
Deir Razih, Welcome to Palestine
Survey of Western Palestine, Map 21:    IAA, Wikimedia commons
Deir Razih Village (Fact Sheet),  Applied Research Institute–Jerusalem, (ARIJ)
Deir Razih Village Profile, ARIJ
 Deir Razih Village Area Photo, ARIJ
 The priorities and needs for development in Deir Razih village based on the community and local authorities’ assessment, ARIJ

Villages in the West Bank